Alata  may refer to:

Alata, Corse-du-Sud, France
Alata, Mali
Alata Research Institute of Horticulture, a research institute in Mersin Province, Turkey